Courtney Jade Nevin (born 12 February 2002) is an Australian soccer player who plays for Leicester City in the Women's Super League on loan from Hammarby IF of the Damallsvenskan and represents Australia internationally. She has previously played for Western Sydney Wanderers and Melbourne Victory in the W-League.

Club career

Junior years
Nevin started playing soccer at her local club, Oakville Ravens, in Blacktown. She started playing at high level from the age of 11, and was at the beginning supported by her school, Oakville Public School. Later she played for Parklea and for Blacktown Spartans. In 2018, Nevin played for Football NSW Institute, where she scored 11 goals in 25 games and won the 2018 NPLW NSW Player of the Year award.

Lower tier
Nevin played for Sydney Olympic in the 2020 National Premier Leagues NSW Women's season, helping them finish second. In February 2021, Nevin re-signed with Blacktown Spartans for the 2021 National Premier Leagues NSW Women's season.

Western Sydney Wanderers
In September 2018, Nevin joined her hometown W-League club Western Sydney Wanderers after training with the club following her strong season with Football NSW Institute. She played nine matches in the 2018–19 W-League season, pushing offensively with 188 passes and creating five scoring chances, while also defending with nine tackles and winning 15 duels. Her performance received praise from others, including American international Kristen Hamilton, who said that she's mature with a unique knowledge of the game for her age. Nevin re-signed with the club in September 2019, in time for the new season, alongside goalkeeper Jada Whyman. In September 2020, Nevin re-signed with Western Sydney Wanderers for her third season, after playing all 13 of the club's matches in the 2019–20 W-League season. A few days later, she was voted by her team-mates as the club's W-League Player of the Year and was awarded the Wanderers Medal. She was praised by assistant coach Catherine Cannuli who called her an unbelievable talent who uses hard work and determination.

Melbourne Victory
In October 2021, Nevin joined defending premiers Melbourne Victory, ahead of the 2021–22 A-League Women season, heralded as one of the country's best young talents. At the end of the season, Melbourne Victory were crowned champions through a 2–1 final win against Sydney FC.

Hammarby IF
On 15 March 2022, Nevin transferred to Hammarby IF in the Swedish Damallsvenskan, together with teammate Kyra Cooney-Cross, signing a two-year-contract.

Loan to Leicester City
In January 2023, Nevin joined English Women's Super League club Leicester City on loan until the end of the season.

International career

Youth
In August 2016, Nevin was called up by Ante Juric to the 23-player squad for the 2017 AFC U-16 Women's Championship qualifiers, contested in Vietnam by Australia's under-17 squad. In their opening match, Nevin scored nine goals in a 28–0 victory over Palestine. She played also in the 8–0 victory over Iraq and scored her 10th goal of the qualifiers in a 6–0 victory over Vietnam. She was one of the players who excelled at the games, finishing second on Australia's goalscorers, behind Sofia Sakalis who scored 11 goals.

In June 2018, Nevin was called up by Leah Blayney to Australia's under-20 squad who competed at the 2018 AFF Women's Championship in Indonesia against senior teams from the ASEAN Football Federation. In the group stage, she played in the 7–0 victory over Malaysia and in the 4–2 defeat to Thailand. Australia qualified for the knockout stage from the second place in the group, and Nevin scored the second goal in the 4–2 victory over Vietnam in the semi-final and also played in the final which Australia lost 3–2 to Thailand. In October 2019, Nevin was once more called up by Blayney, this time for the 2019 AFC U-19 Women's Championship squad. She played in all five games of the tournament: a 5–1 defeat to North Korea, a 3–1 victory over Thailand in which she scored the third goal from a free kick, a 1–0 victory over Vietnam, a 7–0 loss to Japan in the semi-finals, and a 9–1 loss to South Korea in the third place match.

Senior
In September 2019, Nevin was called up for a training camp of Australia's senior team, ahead of their friendlies against Chile. The camp took place during her studies for the HSC and she said she felt both excited and scared to train alongside her heroes. In June 2021, Nevin was called up for the first time for a senior international match squad, when Tony Gustavsson selected her in his 25-player squad for friendlies against Denmark and Sweden. She found out she was called-up while watching television with her friend and team-mate Kyra Cooney-Cross. She made her debut in the first match against Denmark, coming on as a substitute in the second half of the 3–2 defeat. In June 2021, Nevin was called up as a travelling reserve player to Australia's 2020 Olympics squad. Subsequently, due to the COVID-19 pandemic, FIFA confirmed a change for the 2020 Olympics, allowing all 22 players to be available on the roster, with 18 being named for each match.

At the Tokyo 2020 Olympics, the Matildas advanced to the quarter-finals with one victory and a draw in the group play. In the quarter-finals they beat Great Britain 4–3 after extra time. However, they lost 1–0 to Sweden in the semi-final and were then beaten 4–3 in the bronze medal playoff by USA. Full details.

Style of play
Nevin plays as a full back, but also goes forward often. Her scoring and assisting with her left foot earned her the nickname "Lethal". To practice scoring, Nevin's father built a custom goal for her in the backyard.

Personal life
Nevin graduated from Westfields Sports High School in 2019.

References

External links
 
 Australia player profile
 Western Sydney Wanderers player profile 
 

2002 births
Living people
Australian women's soccer players
Western Sydney Wanderers FC (A-League Women) players
Melbourne Victory FC (A-League Women) players
Australia women's international soccer players
A-League Women players
Hammarby Fotboll (women) players
Leicester City W.F.C. players
Women's association football midfielders
Footballers at the 2020 Summer Olympics
Olympic soccer players of Australia
Damallsvenskan players
Australian expatriate sportspeople in Sweden
Expatriate women's footballers in Sweden
Australian expatriate women's soccer players
Australian expatriate sportspeople in England
Expatriate women's footballers in England
Soccer players from Sydney